Marcia Jones (born circa 1972 in Chicago Illinois) is an American professor and contemporary artist, known for her multimedia and large-scale installation works.

Early life and education
Jones was born premature at Chicago's Little Company of Mary Hospital to Paul Davis and Christine Jones. After moving many times with her mother, she spent her high school years in Los Angeles, CA at Marshall High School. Jones majored in Fashion Design at Clark Atlanta University where she later taught and moved to New York in 1995 after being inspired by artists like Radcliffe Bailey to pursue fine art. She studied under Juan Logan, Kojo Griffin, Susan Page and Cora Cohen at UNC Greensboro to earn her MFA in visual arts in 2004.

Career
Jones moved to New York in 1995 to pursue fashion design and worked for Harriette Cole before finding her calling as a fine artist. She was a kinetic (performance) painter, painting to live music on stage, with the Brooklyn Bohemian scene at venues such as the Brooklyn Moon Cafe that incubated the beginnings of careers such as Mos Def, Common, Saul Williams, Erykah Badu, Kevin Powell, and Sarah Jones. Her work appears as the cover art for Saul Williams' book, The Seventh Octave and his album, Amethyst Rock Star, and she collaborated with him on his book, S/HE.

Jones' work was featured on numerous book covers and has exhibited at the New Museum of Contemporary Art, Museum of Contemporary Art, Chicago, Southeastern Center for Contemporary Art, Rush Arts Gallery and The 18th street Art Center, Weatherspoon Art Museum, The Greensboro Artist League, New Image Art Gallery, and Spelman College. She was a Professor of Art at Clark Atlanta University 2004-2009

Jones' work explores personal identity, sexuality, history and the female paradigm. Her exhibition at the Harvey B. Gantt Center explored the dichotomy of the virgin and the whore through an analogy with Haitian Voodoo motifs and Magic City strip club culture. There was significant controversy about the piece.

Jones was a 2011 Artist-in-Residence at the McColl Center for Art + Innovation in Charlotte, NC. Also in 2011 Jones was chosen to discuss creativity on a panel for Rocco Landesman, chairman of the National Endowment for the Arts. She was featured in the Afropunk Showcase at Moogfest in 2014. In 2005 she received a Caversham Printmaking Fellowship and attended the Spelman College Taller Portobello Artist Colony in 2006.

In 2018 Jones' work was included in the exhibition Black Blooded at the New Gallery of Modern Art in Charlotte, NC. A performance of hers was featured as part of the opening reception, in which she wore raven feathers and a white dress while creating a live kinetic drawing in charcoal. The ephemera from the work was displayed in the gallery following the exhibition. Also included in this exhibit, curated by Jessica Moss, were works by Mickalene Thomas, Theaster Gates, Hebru Brantley, Zun Lee, Rashayla Marie Brown and Kerry James Marshall.

Also in 2018 Jones included work in The Black Woman is God: Assembly of Gods an annual exhibition of work by Black women artists at SOMArts Gallery in San Francisco.

Personal life
Jones met poet Saul Williams after moving to New York and in 1996 birthed their daughter, Saturn River Renge, after sixty-hour labor.  In 2004, three days after earning her MFA, Jones was hospitalized and diagnosed with Multiple Sclerosis.

References 

1972 births
Living people
African-American women artists
American contemporary painters
American women artists
Artists from Charlotte, North Carolina
Clark Atlanta University alumni
University of North Carolina at Greensboro alumni
African-American painters
21st-century African-American artists
21st-century African-American women
20th-century African-American artists
20th-century African-American women
20th-century African-American people